The 2010 LPGA Championship was the 56th LPGA Championship, held June 24–27 at Locust Hill Country Club in Pittsford, New York, a suburb southeast of Rochester. Known for sponsorship reasons as the LPGA Championship presented by Wegmans, it was the second of four major championships on the LPGA Tour during the 2010 season.

The champion was Cristie Kerr, age 32, with a 269 (−19) to win by twelve strokes over Song-Hee Kim. It was Kerr's second major championship and fourteenth career win on the LPGA Tour, and vaulted her from fifth to first in the world rankings.

This was the first of four consecutive years the LPGA Championship was played at Locust Hill;  the previous five editions were played at Bulle Rock Golf Course in Havre de Grace, Maryland. The LPGA had an annual tour event at Locust Hill since 1979; first known as The Sarah Coventry, it became the Wegmans LPGA in 1998 and was played through 2009.

Course layout

Field
The field was composed of 150 players, with the cut to the top 70 players and ties after the second round.

Past champions in the field

Made the cut

Missed the cut

Round summaries

First round
Thursday, June 24, 2010

Source:

Second round
Friday, June 25, 2010

The cut was at 148 (+4) or better and 73 players advanced to play on the weekend.

Third round
Saturday, June 26, 2010

Final round
Sunday, June 27, 2010

Source:

References

External links
Wegmans LPGA Championship
Coverage on LPGA Tour's official site
Locust Hill Country Club
Golf Observer.com - leaderboard - 2010 LPGA Championship

Women's PGA Championship
Golf in New York (state)
LPGA Championship
LPGA Championship
LPGA Championship
LPGA Championship